In organic chemistry, an enyne is an organic compound containing a  double bond (alkene) and a  triple bond (alkyne). It is called a conjugated enyne when the double and triple bonds are conjugated.

The term is a contraction of the terms alkene and alkyne.

The simplest enyne is vinylacetylene.

See also
Enyne metathesis
Enediyne
Polyyne

References

Chemical nomenclature
Alkene derivatives
Alkyne derivatives
Conjugated hydrocarbons